Mihály Vasas (born 14 September 1933) is a Hungarian football forward who played for Hungary in the 1958 FIFA World Cup. He also played for Salgótarjáni BTC.

References

External links
 FIFA profile

1933 births
Hungarian footballers
Hungary international footballers
Association football forwards
1958 FIFA World Cup players
Hungarian football managers
Szombierki Bytom managers
People from Békéscsaba
Living people
Sportspeople from Békés County
20th-century Hungarian people